Disodium malonate is a sodium salt of malonic acid with the chemical formula C3H2O4Na2. It is a white crystal soluble in water but not in alcohols, esters or benzene. It can be prepared from the reaction of sodium hydroxide and malonic acid:
CH2(COOH)2 + 2 NaOH → C3H2O4Na2 + 2 H2O

Malonates
Organic sodium salts